Government Savings Bank may refer to:

 Government Savings Bank (Thailand)
 The Government Savings Bank (1833), a historical bank in British India
 Queensland Government Savings Bank, a historical bank in Australia